The Diocese of Vincennes (in Latin, Vincennapolis), the first Roman Catholic diocese in Indiana, was erected 6 May 1834 by Pope Gregory XVI. Its initial ecclesiastical jurisdiction encompassed Indiana as well as the eastern third of Illinois. In 1843 the Diocese of Chicago was erected from the Illinois portion of the diocese, and in 1857 Diocese of Fort Wayne was erected from the northern half of Indiana. The seat of the episcopal see was transferred from Vincennes, Indiana, to Indianapolis, and on 28 March 1898 it became the Diocese of Indianapolis. Pope Pius XII elevated the Indianapolis diocese to an archdiocese in 1944, and erected two new Indiana dioceses: the Diocese of Evansville and the Diocese of Lafayette. The Diocese of Gary, Indiana, was erected in 1956. The Evansville Diocese absorbed the city of Vincennes upon its creation.

Diocesan Bishops of Vincennes 
Simon Bruté de Rémur (Consecrated 28 October 1834 – Died 26 June 1839)
Célestine de la Hailandière (Consecrated 18 August 1839 – Resignation accepted 29 March 1847)  
Jean Bazin (Consecrated 24 October 1847 – Died 23 April 1848)
Jacques Maurice de St. Palais (Consecrated 14 January 1849 – Died 28 June 1877) St. Palais also served as administrator of the diocese from Bishop Badin's death on 23 April 1848 to 14 January 1849.
Francis Silas Chatard (Consecrated 12 May 1878 – Died 7 September 1918) Bishop Chatard became the first Bishop of Indianapolis on 28 March 1898, after the episcopal see was moved to Indianapolis.

The first four Bishops of Vincennes resided at the seat of the episcopal diocese in Vincennes. Their remains are buried in the crypt of St. Francis Xavier Basilica, Vincennes. Bishop Chatard, who resided in Indianapolis and also served as Bishop of Indianapolis, was interred at Saints Peter and Paul Cathedral, Indianapolis; his remains were moved to Calvary Cemetery, Indianapolis, in 1976.

History

Early mission (1675–1834)
Before the Diocese of Vincennes was erected in 1834 its territory passed through three ecclesiastical jurisdictions: the Diocese of Quebec, Canada, until 1789; the Diocese of Baltimore, Maryland, 1789 to 1808; and the Diocese of Bardstown, Kentucky, 1808 to 1834. It is believed that the first French Jesuit missionaries came to the area that included the site of present-day Vincennes, Indiana, in the late 17th century, around 1675. In these early years, the Diocese of Quebec supported the Catholic mission churches in the area. Father Mermet, who may have been the first priest at the site that became known as Vincennes, arrived around 1712, but it is not known how long he stayed.

The earliest Catholic Church at Vincennes was established around 1732, and became known as St. Francis Xavier. It served as the cathedral for the Diocese of Vincennes from 1834 to 1898. Father Sebastian Louis Meurin, St. Francis Xavier's first resident priest, arrived in May 1748, but the earliest records of the Catholic Church in Vincennes, Indiana date to 21 April 1749. After Father Meurin's departure from Vincennes in 1753, several itinerant priests visited the Catholic parish, including Father Pierre Gibault, who visited the area in 1770. Father Gibault served as the resident priest at St. Francis Xavier from 1785 to 1789. During this early period, the Catholic communities in the area experienced hardships during the American Revolution, conflicts with Native Americans, and suffered from epidemics that swept through the frontier. The Diocese of Quebec served Catholic parishes across North America, but it lacked money and sufficient priests.

On 6 November 1789, when Pope Pius VI erected the Diocese of Baltimore as the first Catholic diocese in the United States, Vincennes and the Catholic missions in what became present-day Indiana were placed under the ecclesiastical jurisdiction of the new diocese. John Carroll was appointed the first Bishop of Baltimore, and in 1791 he sent Fr. Benedict Joseph Flaget to succeed Fr. Gibault at the fledgling St. Francis Xavier parish in Vincennes. Father Flaget arrived at Vincennes on 21 December 1792. Before he was recalled to Baltimore in 1795, Father Flaget opened a school and held classes at St. Francis Xavier church. The school's curriculum included religious studies, music, and vocational training. John Francis Rivet, Father Flaget's successor, arrived at Vincennes in 1796 to continue Flaget's work and died there in 1804. Father Rivet, who received a $200 annual salary from the U.S. Congress, became the first public school teacher in the Northwest Territory.

In 1808 Pope Pius VII divided the Catholic churches in the United States and its territories into five dioceses. The Catholic parishes in the northwest territories, which included the Indiana Territory, became part of the Diocese of Bardstown, with Fr. Flaget appointed as its first bishop. In 1814 he became the first Catholic bishop to visit Indiana. In 1832 Bishop Flaget and Bishop Joseph Rosati, the first bishop of the Diocese of St. Louis, Missouri, petitioned the Holy See to name Simon Bruté de Rémur as the first Bishop of Vincennes.

Diocese under Bishop Bruté (1834–1839)

On 6 May 1834 Pope Gregory XVI issued a Papal Bull to erect the Diocese of Vincennes, the first episcopal see in Indiana. Fr. Simon Bruté de Rémur was consecrated as the first Bishop of Vincennes on 28 October 1834 at St. Louis, and arrived at Vincennes on 5 November 1834. At the time of his installation, there were only three priests in his diocese which covered all of Indiana and the eastern third of Illinois. Bishop Bruté made a point to visit each Catholic family in his diocese, regardless of the distance from his rectory at Vincennes. He also founded a college at Vincennes in 1837, and connected it to a theological seminary for men to train for the priesthood that had been established under the Eudists. In 1839 they purchased a building on the site of the first Vincennes University, which failed, and named the new school St. Gabriel's College. The college closed in 1845, but its building was home to St. Rose Academy until it moved to a new location in 1884.

Bishop Bruté's devotion to the diocese contributed to his demise. He became ill while attending a provincial council in Baltimore, Maryland. The illness weakened his immune system, but he continued his duties until his death at Vincennes on 26 June 1839. His remains are buried in the St. Francis Xavier crypt at Vincennes.

Diocese under Bishop Hailandière (1839–1847)

Father Célestine Guynemer de la Hailandière, Bishop Bruté's vicar general, was consecrated as the second Bishop of Vincennes on 18 August 1839 at the Chapel of Sacred Heart in Paris, France. The new bishop remained in France for several months to raise funds and make arrangements for improvements to the diocese. Among his most significant achievements were completing St. Francis Xavier Cathedral at Vincennes, and construction of a library to house Bishop Bruté's collection of more than 5,000 books and religious documents. He consecrated the cathedral on 8 August 1841.

The diocese quickly expanded its services under Bishop Hailandière's direction. He arranged for the Sisters of Providence to establish their order within the diocese, and encouraged the Brothers of the Holy Cross to establish schools for boys. He also called on Catholic leaders, including Father Edward Sorin, founder of the University of Notre Dame, and Mother Théodore Guérin, founder of Sisters of Providence of Saint Mary-of-the-Woods, to join him in Indiana.

Despite Bishop de Hailandière' efforts in Indiana, its population grew slowly and the institutions that he helped to establish suffered many problems. He became discouraged and resigned in 1847. Bishop Hailandière returned to France, where he died on 1 May 1882. His remains are buried in the crypt at St. Francis Xavier in Vincennes.

Diocese under Bishop Bazin (1847–1849)

John Stephen Bazin, Bishop Hailandière's successor, was appointed the third Bishop of Vincennes on 3 September 1847. He was the first bishop ordained in Indiana. Bishop Bazin's consecration took place at St. Francis Xavier Cathedral in Vincennes on 24 October 1847.

Ill health shortened his service to the diocese. Within a few months of his consecration, Bishop Bazin appointed Jacques Maurice de St. Palais, his vicar general, as administrator to the diocese. Bishop Bazin died at Vincennes on 23 April 1848, after having served about six months.

Diocese under Bishop St. Palais (1849–1878)

Jacques Maurice de St. Palais, Bishop Bazin's successor, was consecrated as the fourth Bishop of Vincennes on 14 January 1849 at Vincennes. During his tenure as bishop, he had to contend with unresolved monetary issues from Hailandière's episcopacy, a cholera epidemic, the American Civil War, and expanding the educational and ministerial opportunities within the diocese. In 1849 Mother Theodore Guerin established St. Ann's orphanage in Vincennes, and in 1853 monks from Einsiedeln, Switzerland, founded St. Meinrad abbey and seminary in southern Indiana, but plans to open a school for Negroes was never carried out.

During the American Civil War several priests from the diocese served as chaplains, and one priest, Fr. Ernest Audran, was drafted as a soldier in 1864. After the war Bishop St. Palais recognized that Indianapolis had become a quickly-growing city, the eighth largest in the United States as of 1870, but deferred the decision to move the seat of the diocese to his successor.

Bishop St. Palais died on 28 June 1877. At the time of his death, the diocese had grown to include 151 churches, 117 priests, and 90,000 parishioners. His remains are buried in the crypt of St. Francis Xavier Basilica at Vincennes.

Diocese under Bishop Chatard (1878–1898)

Fr. Francis Silas Chatard, Indiana's first American-born bishop, was consecrated as Bishop of Vincennes in Rome, Italy, on 12 May 1878. He established his residence at Indianapolis in 1878, and in 1898 Pope Leo XII approved Bishop Chatard's request to transfer the episcopal see to Indianapolis.

The Diocese of Vincennes became the Diocese of Indianapolis on 28 March 1898, and Bishop Chatard became the first Bishop of Indianapolis. He died at Indianapolis on 7 September 1918, and was interred at Saints Peter and Paul Cathedral. His remains were later moved to Calvary Cemetery, Indianapolis.

St. John the Evangelist Church, Indianapolis, served as the pro-cathedral of the Diocese of Indianapolis until Saints Peter and Paul Cathedral was completed in 1907.

Change from residential to titular see 
During the 19th century the Diocese of Vincennes was divided and two suffragan sees were erected in Indiana and Illinois. In 1843 the Illinois portion of the diocese became the Diocese of Chicago. On 8 January 1857 the northern half of Indiana comprised the Diocese of Fort Wayne.

On 28 March 1898 the episcopal diocese was transferred from Vincennes to Indianapolis, and the 
Diocese of Vincennes became the Diocese of Indianapolis. In 1944 Pope Pius XII elevated the Indianapolis diocese to an archdiocese and founded two new Indiana dioceses: the Diocese of Evansville and the Diocese of Lafayette. The city of Vincennes, the former seat of the Diocese of Vincennes, became part of the newly created Roman Catholic Diocese of Evansville, which ended its connection to the Archdiocese of Indianapolis. The Diocese of Gary was erected on 17 December 1956.

In 1995 the former diocese was restored as the titular episcopal see of Vincennes, and in 1997 Bishop Gerald Eugene Wilkerson was appointed as its first titular bishop.

Notes

References
 
 
 
 
 
 
 
 
 
 
 
 

Catholic titular sees in North America
Roman Catholic Ecclesiastical Province of Indianapolis
History of Catholicism in Indiana
1834 establishments in Indiana
1898 disestablishments in Indiana